1st Conference was the tournament of Shakey's V-League (SVL) from 2004-2014.

List of 1st Conference Champions

Per season

Per Team

References